Veljko Birmančević (born 5 March 1998) is a Serbian professional footballer who plays as an attacking midfielder for Toulouse FC.

Club career

Partizan
Birmančević signed his first professional contract with Partizan on 12 February 2016, and got the jersey number 30. He made his Serbian SuperLiga debut on 21 February 2016 in a match against OFK Beograd. Later, during the spring half-season, coach Ivan Tomić used him as a back-up player in matches against Radnik Surdulica and Vojvodina. In summer 2016, Birmančević was loaned to Teleoptik, where he scored 4 goals on 22 matches in the Serbian League Belgrade for the 2016–17 season. He also extended his loan to Teleoptik for the 2017–18 Serbian First League campaign. He was sold from Malmö FF to Toulouse FC for a sum around €5 million.

International career
Birmančević was called in U18 national during the 2015, and scored 1 goal in a friendly match against Poland. In August 2016, he was called into the Serbia U19 squad for the memorial tournament "Stevan Vilotić - Ćele". Birmančević scored his first goal for Serbia U19 in a match against Sweden, played on 14 November 2016.

Career statistics

Club

International

Honours
Partizan
Serbian Cup: 2015–16
Teleoptik
Serbian League Belgrade: 2016–17
Malmö FF
 Allsvenskan: 2021
 Svenska Cupen: 2021–22

Individual
Allsvenskan Young Player of the Year: 2021
Svenska Cupen Top goalscorer: 2021–22

References

External links
 Veljko Birmančević stats at utakmica.rs
 
 
 
 

1998 births
Living people
Sportspeople from Šabac
Serbian footballers
Association football midfielders
Serbia international footballers
Serbia youth international footballers
Serbia under-21 international footballers
Serbian First League players
Serbian SuperLiga players
Allsvenskan players
Ligue 1 players
FK Partizan players
FK Teleoptik players
FK Rad players
FK Čukarički players
Malmö FF players
Toulouse FC players
Serbian expatriate footballers
Serbian expatriate sportspeople in Sweden
Expatriate footballers in Sweden
Serbian expatriate sportspeople in France
Expatriate footballers in France